George Davis (7 November 1889 – 19 April 1965) was a Dutch-born American actor. He appeared in more than 260 films between 1916 and 1963. He was born in Amsterdam and died in Los Angeles, California, from cancer.

Selected filmography

 The Yellow Traffic (1914)
 Out of the Fog (1919) - Brad Standish
 Three Ages (1923) - Roman Guard Knocked Down (uncredited)
 Sherlock Jr. (1924) - Conspirator (uncredited)
 Stupid, But Brave (1924, short) - A Bum / The Race Starter (uncredited)
 He Who Gets Slapped (1924) - A Clown (uncredited)
 The Iron Mule (1925, short)
 The Phantom of the Opera (1925) - Guard at Christine's Door (uncredited)
 The Tourist (1925, short)
 Cleaning Up (1925, short) - The Wife's Brother
 The Fighting Dude (1925, short) - The Dude's Valet
 My Stars (1926, short) - The Butler
 Home Cured (1926, short)
 Fool's Luck (1926, short) - Cuthbert - The Valet
 His Private Life (1926 short) - His Valet
 Into Her Kingdom (1926) - Russian Officer / Court Leader
 The Magic Flame (1927) - The Utility Man
 The Circus (1928) - A Magician
 The Wagon Show (1928) - Hank
 4 Devils (1928) - Mean Clown
 The Awakening (1928) - The Orderly
 Sin Sister (1929)
 Broadway (1929) - Joe the Waiter
 The Kiss (1929) - Detective Durant
 Devil-May-Care (1929) - Groom
 Not So Dumb (1930)
 Laugh and Get Rich (1931)
 The Big Trail (1931)
 The Little Cafe (1931)
 Strangers May Kiss (1931)
 The Common Law (1931)
 Men of Chance (1931)
 Keep Laughing (1932)
 The Man from Yesterday (1932)
 Under Cover Man (1932)
 Private Lives (1933)
 Reunion in Vienna (1933)
 The Merry Widow (1934) French version
 I Met Him in Paris (1937)
 Everything Happens at Night (1939)
 Charlie Chan in City in Darkness (1939)
 Ninotchka (1939) (uncredited)
 The Pied Piper (1942)
 Bomber's Moon (1943) (uncredited)
 The Dolly Sisters (1945)
 In a Lonely Place (1950) (uncredited)
 Secrets of Monte Carlo (1951)
 The Lady Says No (1952)

References

External links

1889 births
1965 deaths
American male film actors
American male silent film actors
Deaths from cancer in California
Male actors from Amsterdam
Dutch emigrants to the United States
20th-century American male actors